Events from the year 1417 in France.

Incumbents
 Monarch – Charles VI

Events
 September 20 – Part of the Hundred Years War, Henry V of England captures Caen in Normandy which remains in English hands until 1450

Deaths
 5 April - John, Duke of Touraine (born 1398)
 22 September - Anne of Auvergne (born 1358)
 29 April - Louis II of Naples, French-born ruler (born 1377)
 Unknown - Jean II de Rieux, Marshal of France (born 1342)

References

1410s in France